Wildlife Safari is a safari park in Winston, Oregon, United States. It is home to hundreds of animals that wander freely over the  park, which guests can drive through. The park also includes a walkthrough exhibit displaying some of the park's smaller animals. It has Oregon's first and maybe only African elephants and maned wolves as of 2021.

The safari has been a member of the Association of Zoos and Aquariums since 1986, one of only three such animal attractions in the state. In 2021, it received a certification from the Zoological Association of America.

History
Frank Hart, a frequent visitor to Africa, created the safari park, which opened in October 1972 as World Wildlife Safari, on a  site. "World" was dropped from the name on June 9, 1974, at the request of the unrelated, non-profit World Wildlife Fund, to avoid confusion. Wildlife Safari became a non-profit organization in 1980, and is overseen by the Safari Game Search Foundation.

Animals
Between the drive-through area and the village, Wildlife Safari features over 600 animals including: red panda, Geoffroy's marmoset, Chilean flamingo, Egyptian goose, cotton-top tamarin, prehensile-tailed porcupine, northern red-billed hornbill, ball python, eastern blue-tongued skink, African spurred tortoise, domestic goat, miniature horse, Sicilian donkey, American alligator, bobcat, white-nosed coatimundi, maned wolf, capybara, ring-tailed lemur, red ruffed lemur, emu, budgerigar, ostrich, southern white rhinoceros, African lion, reticulated giraffe, scimitar-horned oryx, Cape eland, Damara zebra, white-bearded wildebeest, Watusi cattle, bald eagle, Greater kudu, waterbuck, American bison, North American black bear, grizzly bear, Roosevelt elk, guanaco, Red wolf, African elephant, hippopotamus, blackbuck, white-cheeked gibbon, fallow deer, nilgai, Tibetan yak, sika deer, dromedary camel, cheetah, Sumatran tiger, rhea, white-naped crane, and East African crowned crane.       
More than 600 of these animals are given free rein on the grasslands, and are accessible for viewing by driving on a  road.  Visitors can stop to view the animals and take pictures anywhere along the main roads.  Protected contact animals separated from the free roaming animals include hippos, elephants, both black and brown bears, tigers,
lions, and cheetahs.

About 90 of the park's animals are in the Safari Village, which includes a petting zoo, train ride, restrooms, a restaurant, a playground, and gift shop.

Other facilities
The Safari Village includes a narrow gauge railroad, Safari Grill Event Center, Cheryl Ford Center, Safari Grill and Gift Shop.  The village area is a traditional zoo setting with smaller exhibits from animals from around the world.  The newest feature to the Safari Village is the Wells Fargo Australian Walkabout exhibit.  The Australian Walkabout immerses the guest into Australia allowing guest to go in with the wallaroos, black swans, emu and the Budgie Aviary.

Conservation
Wildlife Safari has a well established cheetah breeding program which, as of July 2021, has produced 231 cubs. In cooperation with the AZA's Species Survival Plan, the cubs are sent to other accredited zoos across the United States.

At least one animal rights organization endorses Wildlife Safari for its animal-focused conditions and care.

Criticism
Wildlife Safari has come under criticism for its treatment of elephants, with California-based animal protection organization In Defense of Animals placing it among the ten worst zoos for elephants for twelve consecutive years; in particular, the organization alleges that the zoo uses bullhooks to force the elephants to perform tricks, most notably washing tourists' cars.

References

External links

Safari parks
Non-profit organizations based in Oregon
Zoos in Oregon
Parks in Douglas County, Oregon
Buildings and structures in Douglas County, Oregon
Tourist attractions in Douglas County, Oregon
1972 establishments in Oregon
Zoos established in 1972